Francesco Zagatti (18 April 1932 – 7 March 2009) was an Italian professional footballer who played as a defender. He usually played as an attacking full-back on either flank, and was known to be a generous, tenacious, and hard-working player, with an ability to make runs down the flank and get on the end of his teammates' passes.

Playing career 
Zagatti started his career at A.C. Milan. He played in their youth team, before making his senior debut in a Serie A game against S.S. Lazio, on 1 June 1952. He went on to spend his whole career with the Rossoneri, later captaining the squad, and winning four Scudetti, one European Cup and one Latin Cup.

After retirement 
After his retirement, Zagatti stayed at Milan as the coach of the youth team and later as a scout. During the 1981–82 season, he also served as head coach for a couple of games.

Death 
Zagatti died on 7 March 2009, aged 76, due to a serious form of Hepatitis.

Honours 
A.C. Milan
 Serie A: 1954–55, 1956–57, 1958–59, 1961–62
 European Cup: 1962–63
 Latin Cup: 1956

Individual
 A.C. Milan Hall of Fame

References

External links 
Profile at MagliaRossonera.it 

1932 births
2009 deaths
Italian footballers
Association football defenders
Serie A players
A.C. Milan players
A.C. Milan non-playing staff